This is a list of diplomatic missions in Thailand. There are 79 embassies and other diplomatic representations in Bangkok. Listed below are the diplomatic missions in Thailand (not including honorary consulates).

Diplomatic missions in Bangkok

Embassies 

 
 
 

 
 

 
 
 

 

 
 
 (Detail)

 
 
 (Detail)
 

 
 
 

 

 

 
 

 

 

 

 

 (Detail)

 

 (Detail)
  

 

 
 (Detail)

Other missions and delegations 
 (Delegation)
 (Taipei Economic and Cultural Office in Thailand)
 (Hong Kong Economic and Trade Office)

Consular missions

Bangkok 
  (Consulate-General)
  (Consulate-General)

Chiang Mai
 (Consulate-General)
 (Consulate)
 (Consulate-General)
 (Consulate-General)
 (Consulate-General)

Khon Kaen
 (Consulate-General)
 (Consulate-General)
 (Consulate-General)

Phuket
 (Consulate-General)
 (Consular Office)
 (Consulate-General)

Sa Kaeo
 (Consulate-General)

Songkhla
 (Consulate-General)
 (Consulate)
 (Consulate-General)

Non-resident embassies accredited to Thailand

Listed by city of residence.

Resident in Beijing, China

Resident in Jakarta, Indonesia

Resident in Kuala Lumpur, Malaysia

Resident in New Delhi, India

Resident in Tokyo, Japan

Resident in other cities 

 (Hanoi)
 (Hanoi)
 (Belmopan)
 (Seoul)
 (Doha)
 (Podgorica)
 (Canberra)
 (San Marino)
 (Canberra)

Former embassies 
  (closed in 2011)

Notes

See also 
 List of diplomatic missions of Thailand
 Foreign relations of Thailand
 Visa requirements for Thai citizens

References

External links 
 Ministry of Foreign Affairs of Thailand
 Diplomatic and Consular List as of August 2021

List
Thailand
Diplomatic missions